Pitt Island is a small island astride Pitt Passage in Puget Sound, located in Pierce County, Washington.

References

Islands of Pierce County, Washington
Islands of Puget Sound
Uninhabited islands of Washington (state)